Colonel John Charles Campbell Daunt VC (8 November 1832 – 15 April 1886) was a recipient of the Victoria Cross, the highest and most prestigious award for gallantry in the face of the enemy that can be awarded to British and Commonwealth forces.

Details
He was 24 years old, and a lieutenant in the 11th Bengal Native Infantry, Bengal Army during the Indian Mutiny when the following deed took place on 2 October 1857 at Ghota Behar, India for which he was awarded the VC:

Further information
He later achieved the rank of colonel. His VC is on display in the Lord Ashcroft Gallery at the Imperial War Museum, London. His son, John, represented Great Britain at the 1900 Summer Olympics in the  men's golf tournament. His granddaughter Yvonne Daunt was a dancer with the Paris Opera in the 1920s.

References

External links
Burial location of John Daunt "Avon"
News item "John Daunt's Victoria Cross sold at auction"

1832 births
1886 deaths
Indian Rebellion of 1857 recipients of the Victoria Cross
British Indian Army officers
British East India Company Army officers
Military personnel from Normandy
British military personnel of the Second Opium War